Srpski Top Model was a Serbian reality documentary television show based on Tyra Banks' America's Next Top Model, and was aired on Prva. The show pits contestants against each other in a variety of competitions to determine who will win the title of the new Serbian "Top Model".

Serbian top model Ivana Stanković equaled the role of Tyra Banks in the original series as the head of the search as well as a mentor for the 15 girls who were chosen to live in a house together in Belgrade.
Together with the panel of judges which included photographer Miša Obradović and fashion expert Nenad Radujević she evaluated the girls in a weekly judging session following eliminations until only three of them are left.

Season one started airing on March 16, 2011 and finished on June 6. Eighteen-year-old Neda Stojanović from Raška won over Bojana Banjac and Milica Đorđević. During the show Stojanović was spotted by a French modelling scout backstage at Belgrade Fashion Week. As reward for her victory she won a modelling contract with Click Fashion Agency, the cover of Grazia and an all-expenses trip to Israel.

Cycles

References

External links
 Constantin Entertainment Production website

Top Model
2011 Serbian television series debuts
2011 Serbian television series endings
Non-American television series based on American television series
Prva Srpska Televizija original programming